Friedrich Bauer may refer to:

 Friedrich Bauer (1903–1970), German type designer
 Friedrich L. Bauer (1924–2015), German computer scientist
 Friedrich Franz Bauer (1903–1972), German photographer